The 1985–86 Northern Football League season was the 88th in the history of Northern Football League, a football competition in England.

Division One

Division One featured 16 clubs which competed in the division last season, along with four new clubs, promoted from Division Two:
 Bedlington Terriers
 Billingham Town
 Brandon United
 Hartlepool United reserves

League table

Division Two

Division Two featured 14 clubs which competed in the division last season, along with six new clubs.
 Clubs relegated from Division One:
 Horden Colliery Welfare
 Shildon
 Clubs joined from the Wearside Football League:
 Blue Star
 Easington Colliery
 Stockton
 Plus:
 Guisborough Town, transferred from the Northern Counties East League

League table

References

External links
 Northern Football League official site

Northern Football League seasons
1985–86 in English football leagues